Jed Richard Graef (born May 1, 1942) is an American former competition swimmer, Olympic champion, and former world record-holder.

Graef grew up in Verona, New Jersey and learned the backstroke while competing with the Montclair YMCA swim team. He attended Princeton University, where he was captain of the Princeton Tigers swim team in 1964.  Graef won the gold medal in the men's 200-meter backstroke at the 1964 Summer Olympics in Tokyo, Japan.

Graef defended a PhD in psychology and is considered as a prominent authority in sports psychology. He was inducted into the International Swimming Hall of Fame as an "Honor Swimmer" in 1988.

See also
 List of members of the International Swimming Hall of Fame
 List of Olympic medalists in swimming (men)
 List of Princeton University people
 List of Princeton University Olympians
 World record progression 200 metres backstroke

References

1942 births
Living people
People from Montclair, New Jersey
People from Verona, New Jersey
American male backstroke swimmers
World record setters in swimming
Olympic gold medalists for the United States in swimming
Princeton Tigers men's swimmers
Swimmers at the 1964 Summer Olympics
Medalists at the 1964 Summer Olympics